Nadia Petrova and Meghann Shaughnessy were the defending champions, but had different outcomes. While Shaughnessy did not compete this year due to a back injury, Petrova partnered with Alina Jidkova and lost in first round to Elena Dementieva and Flavia Pennetta.

Dementieva and Pennetta won the title, defeating Angela Haynes and Bethanie Mattek 6–2, 6–4 in the final. It was the 1st and only title of the year, the 5th and final title for Dementieva, and the 1st title of Pennetta, in their respective careers.

Seeds

Draw

Draw

External links
 Main and Qualifying Draws

Doubles
2005 WTA Tour
2005 in American tennis